{{DISPLAYTITLE:C12H9F3N2O2}}
The molecular formula C12H9F3N2O2 (molar mass: 270.21 g/mol, exact mass: 270.0616 u) may refer to:

 Teriflunomide
 Leflunomide